Livingston Manor was a  tract of land in the Province of New York granted to Robert Livingston the Elder during the reign of George I of Great Britain.

History

Livingston Manor was a  tract of land in the colonial Province of New York granted to Robert Livingston the Elder through the influence of 5th Governor Thomas Dongan, and confirmed by royal charter of George I of Great Britain in 1715, creating the manor and lordship of Livingston. The original patent was obtained in July 1686.  This tract embraced a large portion of what is now Columbia County. The lords of the manor were:

Robert Livingston the Elder (1654–1728), served from 1715 to 1728.
Philip Livingston (1686–1749), served from 1728 to 1749.
Robert Livingston (1708–1790), served from 1749 to 1790.

Although an English-deeded tract, some sources list Livingston Manor with the patroonships of New Netherland.

Division of land
The first division of the estate occurred in 1728 upon the death of Robert Livingston the Elder, who stipulated that his third son, Robert Livingston (1718–1775), be granted  from Livingston Manor's southwest corner, a tract which Robert christened Clermont Manor.

In 1790, upon the death of the last lord of the manor, Robert Livingston (1708–1790), the remainder of Livingston Manor was divided among his heirs, rather than continue to pass down through primogeniture, as Robert disapproved of his eldest son, who had made many unwise financial decisions and was perennially in debt. The inheritors of the estate were all men who had distinguished themselves considerably during and after the American Revolution:

Philip Livingston (1716–1778), delegate to the Continental Congress and signatory of the United States Declaration of Independence
William Livingston (1723–1790), 1st Governor of New Jersey and signatory of the United States Constitution
William Alexander  (1726–1783), a brother-in-law who had married Sarah Livingston (1725–1805), the daughter of Philip Livingston, 2nd Lord of Livingston Manor, and Robert’s sister. Alexander had been a major general in the Continental Army during the American Revolutionary War
James Duane (1733–1797), a son-in-law and Robert’s former ward, who had married his daughter Mary (1738–1821).  Duane had been a delegate to the Continental Congress, 44th Mayor of New York City, and signatory of the Articles of Confederation

These four heirs subsequently divided the land among their own families, and the power of the Livingston family was slowly diminished. A portion of the estate is still held by the family.  The town of Livingston, New York occupies part of the original tract.

Present day
The original Livingston Manor encompasses the present day towns of Livingston, Germantown, Clermont, Taghkanic, Gallatin, Copake, and Ancram, located in Columbia County New York.

Others

Livingston Manor, New York
Livingston Manor, in present-day Sullivan County in New York State, capitalizes on the Livingston Manor name because Manor family members and descendants had a house there however it was not part of the original manor

In 1750, Robert Livingston, the third lord, bought  in the area shortly after becoming the third (and final) Lord of the Manor of Livingston Manor in Columbia County.  Most of the land would be sold or leased by 1780.  Robert's third son John Robert Livingston (1775–1851) deeded  to his nephew Dr. Edward R. Livingston in 1822 around area then called Purvis, New York.

In 1882, Purvis was renamed Livingston Manor.  Edward's manor, which was actually just a house, was on the site of the present village firehouse, according to a modern sign in the village, however other speculation says the house was on the location of the village Town Hall.

Livingston Manor, New Jersey
The Reverend John Henry Livingston, a member of the Livingston family, was chosen head of Queen's College (now Rutgers University) and in 1809 purchased a  plot of land nearby Raritan Landing, which would thereafter be known as the Livingston Manor. A Greek Revival mansion built by descendants Robert and Louisa Livingston around 1843 stands on the property and is now known as Livingston Homestead. At the turn of the 20th century, the property was developed as a streetcar suburb, and in 2004 became part of the Livingston Manor Historic District. The house and the district are listed on the New Jersey Register of Historic Places and  the National Register of Historic Places.

See also
John Livingstone

References

 Raken.com, Manor Lords
 CooperativeIndividualism.org, Dutch Patroons

External links

History of Columbia County, New York
Dutchess County, New York
Pre-statehood history of New York (state)
New Netherland
History of the Thirteen Colonies
Livingston family residences